{{Album ratings
|rev1 = Allmusic
|rev1score = 
|rev2 = Rock on Request
|rev2score = (favorable)
|rev3 = Tunelab
|rev3score = 
|rev4 = Type 3 Media
|rev4score = <ref name="Type3Media">{{cite web |first=J. |last=P. |title=Review: Review: Sick Puppies - 'Tri-Polar |url=http://type3media.com/press/2009/07/14/album-review-sick-puppies-tri-polar/ |publisher=Type 3 Media |accessdate=5 September 2009}}</ref>
}}Tri-Polar'' is the third studio album by Australian rock band Sick Puppies, released on 14 July 2009.

The album debuted at number 31 on the Billboard 200 albums chart, selling around 16,500 copies. Tri-Polar has sold over 379,000 copies as of 2013.

The band's first single titled "You're Going Down", was used by the WWE as the official theme song for their PPV event WWE Extreme Rules 2009, and the video game WWE SmackDown vs. Raw 2010. The song was also used in the 2010 live-action film adaptation of Tekken and the trailer for My Soul to Take.

The song "War" was written for Capcom's video game Street Fighter IV and has been used in their respective advertisements for the game.

The second single from the album, titled "Odd One", was released to rock radio on 10 November 2009.

The third single, "Maybe", was released to rock radio on 22 June 2010. This is the band's most successful single to date.

The fourth single from the album, "Riptide", was released to rock radio on 8 February 2011.

The album's cover art is a rendering of Borromean rings.

Track listing

 Bonus tracks 

Tour
Sick Puppies supported Rev Theory and Breaking Benjamin during the end of 2009, and also co-headlined a tour with Hurt, The Veer Union, Adelitas Way and Tunnels to Holland as support acts. They also supported Nickelback on their Dark Horse World tour.

Sick Puppies headlined a 2010 summer tour with Janus, My Darkest Days and It's Alive as support.

On 14 December 2010, Shimon Moore announced during a show in Council Bluffs, IA that that show was the largest show ever to date. Also at that show was Shaman's Harvest and Emphatic.

PersonnelSick Puppies Shim Moore – lead vocals, guitars
 Emma Anzai – bass, backing vocals
 Mark Goodwin – drumsArtwork Matt Taylor – cover design
 Travis Shinn – photographyProduction'''
 Antonina Armato – producer
 Tim James – producer
 Adam Comstock, Dorian Crozier, Steve Hammons, Ross Hogarth, and Nigel Lundemo – engineers
 Robert Vosgien – mastering
 Ben Grosse and Mark Needham – mixing
 Will Brierre and Paul Pavao – mixing assistants
 Devrim "DK" Karaoglu – programming

Chart performances

Album

Singles

References

Sick Puppies albums
2009 albums
Albums produced by Rock Mafia
Virgin Records albums